The eleventh season of Cuba's primary amateur baseball league ended with a repeat champion. For the second straight year, Azucareros won the Cuban National Series, defeating Mineros 2-1 games in best-of-three-playoffs after the teams tied for the best record in the league.

Standings

Playoff for the championship (best-of-three)
Azucareros - Mineros 2 - 1 games

Trivia
Mineros put together a 25-game winning streak during the season, while Matanzas lost 25 in a row.

References

 (Note - text is printed in a white font on a white background, depending on browser used.)

Cuban National Series seasons
1971 in Cuban sport
1972 in Cuban sport
1972 in baseball